Landon Anthony Vannata (born March 14, 1992) is an American professional mixed martial artist who currently competes in the featherweight division of the Ultimate Fighting Championship. A professional competitor since 2012, he has formerly competed for the RFA and Pancrase.

Early years
Vannata was born in Neptune, New Jersey and at the age of 13, began wrestling and Brazilian Jiu-Jitsu. Vannata later wrestled at an NCAA Division I University of Tennessee at Chattanooga, but dropped out after one semester. After dropping out, he left for Albuquerque, New Mexico to join JacksonWink Academy

Mixed martial arts career

Early career
Vannata made his professional MMA debut in May 2012. He amassed an undefeated record of 8–0 in various promotions over the next four years before joining the UFC.

Ultimate Fighting Championship
After an injury to Michael Chiesa, Vannata was called on two weeks' notice to fight against ranked #3 lightweight Tony Ferguson on July 16, 2016, at UFC Fight Night 91. After an exciting back-and-forth fight, and almost finishing Ferguson with strikes in the first round he lost by submission in the second round. Both participants were awarded a Fight of the Night bonus.

Vannata faced John Makdessi on December 10, 2016, at UFC 206 He won the fight via highlight reel spinning heel kick knockout in the first round and was awarded a Performance of the Night bonus.

Vannata faced David Teymur on March 4, 2017, at UFC 209. He lost the fight via unanimous decision. The fight was awarded Fight of the Night honors.

Vannata was expected to face Abel Trujillo on October 7, 2017, at UFC 216. However, Trujillo was removed from the card on August 14 for undisclosed reasons and replaced by Bobby Green. Vannata struck Green with a knee while Green was a grounded opponent, which caused referee Herb Dean to deduct one point from Vannata. The judges handed down a split draw after three rounds with score of 29-27-27-29 and 28-28. This fight earned him Fight of the Night award.

Vannata was linked to a fight with Gilbert Burns on April 14, 2018, at UFC on Fox 29. However, the pairing never materialized as Vannata was unable to accept the fight for this date/event as he was still rehabilitating a recent arm injury.

Vannata faced Drakkar Klose on July 7, 2018, at UFC 226. He lost the fight by unanimous decision. After the fight with Klose, Vannata departed from Jackson Wink MMA Academy in the heels of Donald Cerrone's departure. Due to the departure, Vannata begun training at both Cerrone's BMF Ranch and Jackson's MMA Association Gym.

Vannata faced Matt Frevola on November 3, 2018, at UFC 230. The bout ended in a majority draw. Shortly after the fight, Vannata announced that he became a free agent. In the beginning of 2019, Vannata announced that he had signed a new, four-fight contract with the UFC.

Vannata faced promotional newcomer Marcos Rosa Mariano on February 10, 2019, at UFC 234. He won the fight via a submission in round one.

Vannata faced Marc Diakiese on September 28, 2019, at UFC Fight Night 160. He lost the fight via unanimous decision.

Vannata faced Yancy Medeiros on February 15, 2020, at UFC Fight Night 167. He won the fight via unanimous decision.

A rematch with Bobby Green took place on August 1, 2020, at UFC Fight Night: Brunson vs. Shahbazyan. He lost the fight via unanimous decision. This fight earned him the Fight of the Night award.

Vannata moved down to featherweight and faced Mike Grundy at UFC 262 on May 15, 2021. He won his 145 lb debut via split decision.

Vannata was scheduled to face Tucker Lutz on November 13, 2021, at UFC Fight Night 197. However, the contest was cancelled in late October as Lutz was removed from the event in favor of another bout.

Vannata faced Charles Jourdain on April 23, 2022 at UFC Fight Night 205. He lost the fight via a guillotine choke in round one.

Vannata was scheduled to face Andre Fili on September 17, 2022 at UFC Fight Night 210. However, Vannata was forced to pull from the event due to injury.

Vannata is scheduled to face Daniel Zellhuber on Apri 15, 2023 at UFC on ESPN 44.

Championships and accomplishments

Mixed martial arts
Ultimate Fighting Championship
Fight of the Night (four times) 
Performance of the Night (one time) 
MMAjunkie.com
2020 August Fight of the Month 
MMADNA.nl
2016 Knockout of the Year vs. John Makdessi

Mixed martial arts record

|-
|Loss
|align=center|12–6–2
|Charles Jourdain
|Submission (guillotine choke)
|UFC Fight Night: Lemos vs. Andrade
|
|align=center|1
|align=center|2:32
|Las Vegas, Nevada, United States
|
|-
|Win
|align=center|12–5–2
|Mike Grundy
|Decision (split)
|UFC 262
|
|align=center|3
|align=center|5:00
|Houston, Texas, United States
|
|-
|Loss
|align=center|11–5–2
|Bobby Green
|Decision (unanimous)
|UFC Fight Night: Brunson vs. Shahbazyan
|
|align=center|3
|align=center|5:00
|Las Vegas, Nevada, United States
||
|-
|Win
|align=center|11–4–2
|Yancy Medeiros
|Decision (unanimous)
|UFC Fight Night: Anderson vs. Błachowicz 2 
|
|align=center|3
|align=center|5:00
|Rio Rancho, New Mexico, United States
|
|-
| Loss
|align=center|10–4–2
|Marc Diakiese
|Decision (unanimous)
|UFC Fight Night: Hermansson vs. Cannonier 
|
|align=center|3
|align=center|5:00
|Copenhagen, Denmark
|
|-
|Win
|align=center|
|Marcos Rosa Mariano
|Submission (kimura)
|UFC 234
|
|align=center|1
|align=center|4:55
|Melbourne, Australia 
|
|-
|Draw
|align=center|9–3–2
|Matt Frevola
|Draw (majority)
|UFC 230 
|
|align=center|3
|align=center|5:00
|New York City, New York, United States
|
|-
|Loss
|align=center|9–3–1
|Drakkar Klose
|Decision (unanimous)
|UFC 226 
|
|align=center|3
|align=center|5:00
|Las Vegas, Nevada, United States
|
|-
|Draw
|align=center|9–2–1
|Bobby Green
|Draw (split)
|UFC 216 
|
|align=center|3
|align=center|5:00
|Las Vegas, Nevada, United States
|
|-
|Loss
|align=center|9–2
|David Teymur
|Decision (unanimous)
|UFC 209
|
|align=center|3
|align=center|5:00
|Las Vegas, Nevada, United States
|
|-
|Win
|align=center|9–1
|John Makdessi
|KO (wheel kick)
|UFC 206
|
|align=center|1
|align=center|1:40
|Toronto, Ontario, Canada
|
|-
|Loss
|align=center|8–1
|Tony Ferguson
| Submission (D'Arce choke)
|UFC Fight Night: McDonald vs. Lineker
|
|align=center|2
|align=center|2:22
|Sioux Falls, South Dakota, United States
|
|-
| Win
| align=center| 8–0
| Ramico Blackmon
| TKO (punches)
| TSE: Rocky Mountain Rubicon 2
| 
| align=center| 1
| align=center| 2:06
| Pueblo, Colorado, United States
|
|-
| Win
| align=center| 7–0
| Chad Curry
| TKO (punches and elbows)
| RFA 32: Blumer vs. Higo
| 
| align=center| 1
| align=center| 1:29
| Prior Lake, Minnesota, United States
|
|-
| Win
| align=center| 6–0
| Santana-Sol Martinez
| Submission (arm-triangle choke)
| Nemesis Promotions: High Altitude Face Off 7
| 
| align=center| 1
| align=center| 1:11
| Alamosa, Colorado, United States
|
|-
| Win
| align=center| 5–0
| Bruce Reis
| Submission (heel hook)
| Jackson's MMA Series 13
| 
| align=center| 2
| align=center| 1:07
| Pueblo, Colorado, United States
| 
|-
| Win
| align=center| 4–0
| Mitsuyoshi Nakai
| Submission (rear-naked choke)
| Pancrase 255
| 
| align=center| 1
| align=center| 4:13
| Tokyo, Japan
|
|-
| Win
| align=center| 3–0
| J. P. Reese
| Decision (split)
| Xtreme FC 25: Boiling Point
| 
| align=center| 3
| align=center| 5:00
| Albuquerque, New Mexico, United States
| 
|-
|  Win
| align=center| 2–0
| Antonio Ramirez
| Submission (rear-naked choke)
| Kamikaze Fight League 2
| 
| align=center| 1
| align=center| 2:11
| Puerto Vallarta, Mexico
| 
|-
| Win
| align=center| 1–0
| Adrian Apodaca
| TKO (punches)
| Mescalero Warrior Challenge 2
| 
| align=center| 1
| align=center| 2:38
| Mescalero, New Mexico, United States
|

References

External links
 
 

1992 births
Living people
American male mixed martial artists
Lightweight mixed martial artists
Mixed martial artists utilizing collegiate wrestling
Mixed martial artists utilizing Brazilian jiu-jitsu
Mixed martial artists from New Jersey
American practitioners of Brazilian jiu-jitsu
People from Neptune City, New Jersey
Sportspeople from Monmouth County, New Jersey
Ultimate Fighting Championship male fighters
American male sport wrestlers
Amateur wrestlers